The acct URI scheme is a proposed internet standard published by the Internet Engineering Task Force, defined by .  The purpose of the scheme is to identify, rather than interact, with user accounts hosted by a service provider.  This scheme differs from the DNS name which specifies the service provider.

The acct URI was intended to be the single URI scheme that would return information about a person (or possibly a thing) that holds an account at a given domain.

Example
The following is an example of an acct URI: 
 acct:juliet%40capulet.example@shoppingsite.example

References

External links
 List of Uniform Resource Identifier (URI) Schemes

Application layer protocols
Internet Standards
Request for Comments
URI schemes
Semantic Web